Zimmermann is a German-language surname.

Zimmermann may also refer to:

 Zimmermann (fashion label), an Australian clothing brand
 Zimmermann (piano), a German piano company
 Zimmermann (publisher), a German sheet-music publisher

See also
 Zimmermann Telegram, a telegram sent by Germany and intended for Mexico, but was intercepted and ultimately led to the entry of the United States into World War I
 Zimmermann reaction, a chemical reaction to test for ketosteroids
 Zimerman
 Zimmerman (disambiguation)